Three ships of the Royal Navy have borne the name HMS Acasta, whilst another two were planned:

  was a 40-gun fifth rate frigate launched in 1797 and broken up in 1821.
 HMS Acasta was to have been a wooden screw frigate. She was laid down in 1861 but was cancelled in 1863.
  was an  launched in 1912 and sold for scrap in 1921.
  was an A-class destroyer launched in 1929.

References
   p. 2.

Royal Navy ship names